The 1979 NCAA Men's Division I Swimming and Diving Championships were contested in March 1979 at the Cleveland State University Natatorium at Cleveland State University in Cleveland, Ohio at the 56th annual NCAA-sanctioned swim meet to determine the team and individual national champions of Division I men's collegiate swimming and diving in the United States. 

California topped the team standings for the first time, the Golden Bears' inaugural national title.

Team standings
Note: Top 10 only
(H) = Hosts
(DC) = Defending champions
Full results

See also
List of college swimming and diving teams

References

NCAA Division I Men's Swimming and Diving Championships
NCAA Division I Swimming And Diving Championships
NCAA Division I Swimming And Diving Championships
NCAA Division I Swimming And Diving Championships